Christos Athanasiadis (born 21 August 1978) is a Greek former professional footballer who played as a defender.

References

1978 births
Living people
Greek footballers
Kavala F.C. players
Niki Volos F.C. players
Doxa Drama F.C. players
Olympiacos Volos F.C. players
Panthrakikos F.C. players
Ilioupoli F.C. players
Association football defenders
Super League Greece players
Footballers from Drama, Greece